The Transport Integration Act 2010 (the Act) is a law enacted by the Parliament of the State of Victoria, Australia. The Act is the prime transport statute in Victoria, having replaced major parts of the Transport Act 1983, which was renamed as the Transport (Compliance and Miscellaneous) Act 1983.

The purpose of the Transport Integration Act is to "...create a new framework for the provision of an integrated and sustainable transport system in Victoria...".  The Act broadly seeks to unify all elements of the Victorian transport portfolio to ensure that transport and land use agencies work together towards the common goal of an integrated and sustainable transport system.

In essence, the Transport Integration Act sets out the policy framework for transport in Victoria and establishes and sets the charters of the key agencies who make decisions which affect the planning and operation of the State's transport system.

One commentator has opined that "(T)he Act is a leading example of modern and progressive principles-based legislation. It marked a fundamental shift away from detailed, prescriptive rules to higher level guidance and more flexible outcomes."

The Transport Integration Act is administered by the Minister for Public Transport, the Hon Jacinta Allan MLA, and the Minister for Ports and Minister for Roads, the Hon Luke Donnellan MLA.

The policy area of the Act contains a vision, objectives and principles for the transport system in Victoria, making it clear that the transport system needs to be integrated and sustainable - in economic terms, in environmental terms and in social terms.   The Act therefore establishes transport in Victoria as a triple bottom line issue.

The Act also consolidates and establishes most of the transport agencies in Victoria and applies its policy framework to those agencies and other non transport interface agencies whose planning and land use activities can have significant effects on the transport system.

Planning 

While comprehensive coverage of transport portfolio matters can be expected of a transport statute the most radical feature of the Transport Integration Act may be its reach into planning activities which are not administrated by transport agencies but which nonetheless can have a major impact on the transport system.   Withington observed that "(F) for the first time, the scope of the State's principal transport statute reaches beyond transport agencies to include "interface bodies" such as planning authorities and land managers".

The Act also requires the development of a transport plan for Victoria and requires that the plan be periodically revised.  It also requires transport agencies regulated by the Act to prepare corporate plans and to coordinate them with the central Department of Transport and other affected transport agencies.

Effects 

Withington observed that "(T) the Act is designed to encourage people to think - in a structured way - about the impacts of their decisions on the transport system.  It is detailed enough to provide clear direction, but also flexible enough to accommodate agencies' different roles and responsibilities and a wide range of different circumstances".

Parts 

The Transport Integration Act is divided into eight parts -
 Preliminary
 Vision statement, Objectives, Principles and Statements of Policy Principles
 Administration (Ministers, Department of Transport, the Secretary, the Transport Infrastructure Development Agent)
 Planning (Transport plan, Corporate plans)
 Transport System Agencies (Director of Public Transport, Public Transport Development Authority, Roads Corporation, Taxi Services Commission)
 Transport Corporations (Victorian Rail Track, V/Line Corporation, Linking Melbourne Authority, Port of Melbourne Corporation, Port of Hastings Development Authority, Victorian Regional Channels Authority)
 Transport Safety Agencies (Director, Transport Safety and Chief Investigator, Transport Safety)
 General

Coverage 
The coverage of the Act is broad and extends to all State-controlled transport activities including most land and water-based transport and some air transport activities.

Transport system activities 
The Act applies to most State transport agencies and their activities through its coverage of Victoria's "transport system".   Accordingly, it applies to things such as -

 heavy and light rail systems including trains and trams
 roads and vehicles including cars, trucks and bicycles
 ports and waterways including commercial ships and recreational vessels
 air transport systems

"Transport system" is defined widely to include not only system infrastructure and conveyances, but also such things as -

 communication systems and other technologies
 strategic, business and operational plans
 schedules, timetables and ticketing systems
 labour components
 service components.

The Act's coverage of the transport system is therefore extensive.  This occurs because "(T) the (Act) recognises that a 21st century transport system should be conceived and planned as a single system performing multiple tasks rather than separate transport modes.

Land use and other activities affecting transport 
The Transport Integration Act also seeks to integrate land use and transport planning and decision-making by extending the framework to land use agencies whose decisions can have significant impact on transport.

Accordingly, the Act can apply to the activities of a range of planning, land use and other agencies.  Generally, the Transport Integration Act "...provides that planning authorities must have regard to the policy framework when preparing a Planning Scheme Amendment...which is 'likely to have a significant impact on the planning system' ".

Overarching status of Act 
The Transport Integration Act has an overarching status in the hierarchy of Victoria's transport legislation.  All other Victorian transport laws, including those relating to particular aspects of the regulation of trains, trams, roads, ports, transport projects and safety, are identified as "transport legislation" under the Act and are therefore captured by the framework and are subordinate to it.

The Act also sits above "interface legislation" in its application to interface bodies.  That is, the Act captures the enabling legislation which creates and empowers the non transport agencies who have a significant impact on the transport system and requires those agencies to have regard to the key policy elements in the Act needed to guide sound transport and land use planning.

Affected agencies

Transport agencies 

The transport decision makers and agencies established and empowered by the Transport Integration Act include -

 Ministers (currently the Minister for Public Transport, the Minister for Roads and the Minister for Ports)
 the Secretary of the Department of Transport
 the Department of Transport
 the Transport Infrastructure Development Agent
 the Director of Public Transport
 the Public Transport Development Authority
 the Taxi Services Commission (initially conducting the Taxi Industry Inquiry)
 the Roads Corporation (VicRoads)
 Victorian Rail Track (VicTrack)
 V/Line Corporation
 the Linking Melbourne Authority
 the Port of Melbourne Corporation
 the Port of Hastings Development Authority
 the Victorian Regional Channels Authority
 the Director, Transport Safety
 the Chief Investigator, Transport Safety
 the Regional Rail Link Authority

The Act requires Victorian transport agencies - including the Director of Public Transport, the Public Transport Development Authority, VicRoads, the Port of Melbourne Corporation, VicTrack, V/Line and the Linking Melbourne Authority – to work collaboratively towards the common goal of an integrated and sustainable transport system.

Private transport operators 
The Act does not apply directly to the private entities contracted to provide metropolitan passenger rail and tram services in Victoria, nor does it apply to metropolitan and regional bus operators.  However, State transport agencies must have regard to the framework under the Act when exercising statutory functions in relation to these private transport operators (including contract management).

Interface agencies 
The interface decision makers and agencies affected by the Transport Integration Act include -

 relevant Victorian Government Ministers including the Minister for Planning
 the Department of Planning and Community Development
 the Growth Areas Authority
 the Department of Sustainability and Environment
 Parks Victoria
 Major Projects Victoria
 Places Victoria, formerly VicUrban
 municipal councils

The Act requires that the interface agencies, including land use agencies, take account of the new Act and its policy directions when making decisions that are likely to have a significant impact on the transport system.

Importantly, the Transport Integration Act also supports and assists the development, implementation and updating of a transport plan for the State.

Policy framework

General 
The centrepiece of the Transport Integration Act is the high level policy framework contained in Part 2.  The key features of the policy framework are a vision for the transport system, six transport system objectives and seven decision making principles.  The core of the policy framework is drawn from the principles of sustainability as applied to the transport sector.  The framework recognises that transport is part of a broader policy goal of achieving sustainable development, both locally and globally.

Sustainability 

In general, the policy framework in the Act adopts the core principles of sustainable development or sustainability and translates that policy into a contemporary and enforceable legislative form in a transport context.

Transport system objectives

Overview 
The transport system objectives in the Transport Integration Act cover the following matters -
 social and economic inclusion
 economic prosperity
 environmental sustainability
 integration of transport and land use
 efficiency, coordination and reliability
 safety and health and wellbeing.

The objectives therefore draw heavily on the key sustainability concepts described above.  Agencies must have regard to the objectives when they make decisions or exercise functions which are sourced back to the authority of the Act.

The need for objectives 
The objectives essentially describe the outcomes sought to be achieved by the scheme.  The need for clear and consistent objectives in policy and legislation settings for transport in Victoria was recognised by both the Transport Legislation Review and the Victorian Competition and Efficiency Commission (VCEC), the latter as part of its final report on managing transport congestion in Victoria.   VCEC observed that -

"The government’s congestion policy priorities need to be supported by clear legislative objectives. If the legislation covering organisations charged with delivering the government’s priorities does not reinforce its policy goals, agencies’ authority to deliver on those goals can be undermined.  This is true for most transport policy areas, but particularly so for congestion where the legislation must support a coordinated  approach across many agencies if congestion is to be effectively addressed."

VCEC commented on the failure of the previous central Victorian Government transport statute, the Transport Act 1983, to set out clear objectives for the transport system and transport agencies: "...the Act does not include a statement of its purpose or objectives to guide interpretation and decision making.  Notwithstanding the absence of express objectives in the Transport Act, this and other Acts state the legislative objectives and functions for the key government agencies involved in transport policy development and service delivery."

VCEC went on to recommend the development of clear and coordinated objectives to apply across the transport portfolio:  "(H) having appropriate high level objectives that ‘cascade’ down into related objectives for each agency is a prerequisite for achieving the government’s desired outcomes for the transport sector. Such objectives can encourage agencies to work consistently to achieve these outcomes, and reduce the risk of inconsistent behaviour."

Decision making principles

Overview 
The decision making principles in the Transport Integration Act cover the following matters -
 integrated decision making
 triple bottom line assessment
 equity
 transport system user perspective
 precautionary principle
 stakeholder engagement and community participation
 transparency.

Purpose 
The decision making principles essentially describe the process elements which must be taken into account by agencies in pursuing the objectives of the scheme and ultimately, the vision for the transport system.  For example, a transport decision which has impacts across all tiers of government - local, State and national - should have regard to an integrated decision making process where due regard is had for effects across all three tiers rather than concentrating on only one or two tiers.

Applying the framework 

In broad terms, transport agencies and interface agencies caught by the Act must have regard to the objectives and principles when exercising their powers and performing their functions. The framework recognises that many transport system decisions involve competing interests and that decisions are unlikely in many cases to satisfy all parties.  This is inherent in the listing of a series of objectives and principles which involve deliberate overlap and tension and which can require careful thought to reconcile.   As a result, the Act merely requires that agencies "have regard" to the matters - that is actively consider them - and does not attempt to prescribe particular outcomes in individual cases.  In addition, the framework specifically provides that the weight to be given to each objective and principle in the Act is not prescribed by the scheme itself and instead is ultimately a matter to be determined by the relevant agency which is responsible for the decision.

Effect of the framework 
The vision statement in the Act is drawn on in the purpose of the Transport Integration Act.  The vision statement and transport system objectives are also relevant to the charters and therefore the legal powers of each transport agency established under the Act.

Each transport agency is required to pursue its statutory object consistent with the vision and the objectives. By way of example, if a transport agency is considering establishing a new transport service such as a rail line or bus line and procuring new rolling stock or buses, it must explicitly turn its mind to the matters in Part 2 of the Act as early as the planning stages of such a project.  Planning agencies have the same obligations.

Adherence to the Act can generally be pursued through administrative law avenues including merits review in some cases.  However, the Act does not create a civil cause of action.

Development of the Act 
The underlying policy for the Transport Integration Act was in development for some years before it was presented to the Victorian Parliament as a Bill for scrutiny, debate and passage.

Process 
In 2007, after several years work the Department of Transport released a discussion paper outlining a policy proposal for a new Transport Integration Bill for Victoria.  An extensive stakeholder consultation process followed throughout Melbourne and regional Victoria.   The Transport Legislation Review: Stakeholder Feedback Summary aimed to reflect the key views held by stakeholders.   Released in 2008, it drew on formal submissions as comments made at workshops, forums and briefings during the community engagement program.

The two-year stakeholder and community consultation process informed the development of the Bill proposal, culminating in the release in July 2009 of the Policy Statement Towards an integrated and sustainable transport future: a new legislative framework for transport in Victoria.

Principles-based approach 
The policy areas of the Transport Integration Act provide an example of principles-based legislation.  This type of legislation relies on broad principles to articulate the outcomes to be achieved by the regulated entities.  The Australian Law Reform Commission has described this approach in the following terms -

"Principles-based regulation can be distinguished from rules-based regulation in that it does not necessarily prescribe detailed steps that must be complied with, but rather sets an overall objective that must be achieved. In this way, principles-based regulation seeks to provide an overarching framework that guides and assists regulated entities to develop an appreciation of the core goals of the regulatory scheme. A key advantage of principles-based regulation is its facilitation of regulatory flexibility through the statement of general principles that can be applied to new and changing situations."

Parliamentary approval

Transport Integration Bill 
The Act originated as the Transport Integration Bill.  The Bill was introduced into the lower house of the Victorian Parliament (the Legislative Assembly) on 8 December 2009 by the Hon Lynne Kosky MP, the then Minister for Public Transport.  Second reading for the Bill was moved on 10 December 2009.

The Bill was eventually debated and passed by the Legislative Assembly without opposition on 4 February 2010.  The Bill was introduced immediately into the upper house of the Victorian Parliament (the Legislative Council) and second reading moved on the same day by the Hon Martin Pakula MLC who had succeeded Lynne Kosky as Minister for Public Transport in the period since the Bill's introduction.

The Transport Integration Bill was ultimately passed without opposition by the Legislative Council on 23 February 2010.  The Bill then received the Royal Assent to become an Act on 2 March 2010.

The Transport Integration Act was subsequently proclaimed to commence on 1 July 2010.

Ports Integration Bill 
The "port corporations", the Port of Melbourne Corporation, the Port of Hastings Corporation and the Victorian Regional Channels Authority were originally not included in the Bill proposal and were added later to the Transport Integration Act scheme by the Transport Legislation Amendment (Ports Integration) Bill 2010 (the Ports Integration Bill).

The Ports Integration Bill merged the Port of Melbourne Corporation and the Port of Hastings Corporation under a rebadged Port of Melbourne Corporation banner.  The Ports Integration Bill was proclaimed to commence on 1 September 2010.  This formally brought the Port of Melbourne Corporation and the Victorian Regional Channels Authority within the Transport Integration Act framework on that date.

The merger of the Port of Melbourne Corporation and the Port of Hastings Corporation has been reversed - see changes to the Act below.

Major amendments to the Transport Integration Act 
A number of significant amendments have already been made to the Transport Integration Act:

Climate Change Act 
The Climate Change Act 2010 amended the Transport Integration Act to amend  the environmental sustainability objective in the transport system objectives of the Transport Integration Act. The amendment changed that objective by providing that the transport system should actively contribute to the reduction of the overall contribution of transport-related greenhouse gas emissions.  In addition, the change require relevant agencies to have regard to preparing for and adapting to the challenges presented by climate change.

The Climate Change Act was passed on 3 September 2010, received royal assent on 14 September 2010 and commenced on 1 July 2011.

Taxi industry reform 
The Transport Legislation Amendment (Taxi Services Reform and Other Matters) Act 2011 amended the Transport Integration Act to create the Taxi Services Commission. The Commission was created as an inquiry body in first instance charged with conducting the Taxi Industry Inquiry, a major inquiry into the taxi industry and taxi services in Victoria, and then to become the ongoing taxi industry regulator in place of the current regulator, the Director of Public Transport and the Victorian Taxi Directorate.

Public Transport Victoria
The Transport Legislation Amendment (Public Transport Development Authority) Act 2011 amended the Transport Integration Act to establish the Public Transport Development Authority, trading as  Public Transport Victoria, and to make other related changes. The legislation partially commenced on 15 December 2011. Further parts of the amending legislation will be proclaimed in the future to provide for the full establishment of the PTDA and to abolish the agencies it replaces - the Director of Public Transport, the Transport Ticketing Authority and MetLink.

Port of Hastings Development Authority Act 
The Transport Legislation (Port of Hastings Development Authority) Act 2011 amended the Transport Integration Act to reverse the merger of the Port of Melbourne Corporation and the Port of Hastings Corporation, which occurred in September 2010, and to establish a Port of Hastings Development Authority to oversee the development of the Port of Hastings as a competitor in container trade to the Port of Melbourne. The legislation was passed on 16 August 2011,  and came into force on 1 January 2012.

Comparison with other jurisdictions 

Nicholas Low has observed that the transport policy directions of both Victoria and New South Wales have pursued "integration" from the start of the 21st century, particularly integrated planning for the various modes of transport and the integration of transport and land use planning.   However, Victoria went further and remains alone among Australian jurisdictions in presenting these general policy directions to full Parliamentary scrutiny and entrenching them in legislative form.   Low comments that the Act "...provides strong legislative support for the development of an integrated and sustainable transport system...".

The Commonwealth Department of Infrastructure and Transport has commented that -

"Victoria has progressively modernised its transport legislation.  The Transport Integration Act 2010, the new principal transport statute, sets out a vision, objectives and principles for transport, making it clear that the transport system needs to be integrated and sustainable.  The Act requires transport agencies and other decision makers to have regard to broader social, economic and environmental considerations.  It unites all elements of the transport portfolio to ensure that transport agencies work towards a common goal of an integrated transport system.  It integrates land use and transport planning and decision making by extending the framework to land-use agencies whose decisions can significantly affect transport, including the government's planning functions, municipal councils, the Growth Area Authority and Parks Victoria".

In addition, the Commonwealth Department of Climate Change and Energy Efficiency noted that the Transport Integration Act appeared to be the only Australian transport statute which explicitly recognised the risks posed by climate change.

Reports continue to call for the adoption of policy and statutes which recognise emphasis on Transport Integration Act objectives including sustainability.  "Moving Australia 2030", a report generated by the Moving People 2030 Taskforce in March 2013 which included representation from planning, public transport, bus and rail lobby groups, is the latest of these documents.  The report instances the Act as a case study for driving integrated decision making in transport, land use planning and sustainability and as a model to be followed by other jurisdictions in Australia.

Despite these observations, other jurisdictions including the Commonwealth have yet to respond to Victoria's leadership towards greater integration and sustainability in transport systems and their regulation.  In fact, concerns exist that national developments are moving away from integrated transport solutions towards greater silo based activity as shown by the establishment of distinct sole purpose national regulators for heavy vehicles, rail and maritime.

In the words of Norman Swann, "(T) the challenge is to apply this new thinking into outcomes for the State - and nationally."

See also 

 Sustainable transport
 Environmental planning
 Regional Rail Link
 VicRoads
 Director of Public Transport
 VicTrack
 Port of Melbourne Corporation
 V/Line
 Director, Transport Safety
 Chief Investigator, Transport Safety
 Public Transport Development Authority
 Taxi Industry Inquiry
 Taxi Services Commission
 Port of Hastings Development Authority
 Transport Legislation Amendment (Taxi Services Reform and Other Matters) Act 2011
 Transport Act 1983
 Transport (Compliance and Miscellaneous) Act 1983

References

External links 
 Department of Transport Information about the Transport Integration Act
 Department of Transport Information about the Transport Legislation Review
 Transport for Melbourne - An advocacy alliance for improved public transport planning in Melbourne that publicly launched in 2016, including with a specific focus on better implementation of the Transport Integration Act 2010 in regard to public transport modal integration. 

Victoria (Australia) legislation
Environmental planning
Transport Integration Act
2010 in Australian law
2010s in Victoria (Australia)
History of transport in Victoria (Australia)
2010 in transport
Transport legislation